Petralona is a metro Line 1 station, located in Petralona 7.016 km from Piraeus station. It is located in Athens and took its name from the neighbourhood in Athens,  It was first opened on 22 November 1954 and features two platforms. It was renovated in 2004.

References

Athens Metro stations
Railway stations opened in 1954
1954 establishments in Greece